Martin St. Amour (born January 30, 1970) is a Canadian former professional ice hockey left winger who played in one National Hockey League game for the Ottawa Senators during the 1992–93 NHL season, on April 4, 1993 against the Vancouver Canucks. The rest of his career, which lasted from 1990 to 2003, was spent in various minor leagues. He is also a former head coach of the San Diego Gulls of the ECHL.

Career statistics

Regular season and playoffs

See also
List of players who played only one game in the NHL

External links

1970 births
Living people
Arizona Sundogs players
Canadian ice hockey left wingers
Cincinnati Cyclones (ECHL) players
Fredericton Canadiens players
Gothiques d'Amiens players
Ice hockey people from Montreal
Los Angeles Ice Dogs players
Montreal Canadiens draft picks
New Haven Senators players
Ottawa Senators players
Prince Edward Island Senators players
Providence Bruins players
San Diego Gulls (WCHL) players
San Francisco Spiders players
Sherbrooke Canadiens players
Trois-Rivières Draveurs players
Verdun Junior Canadiens players
Whitley Warriors players